The Grammy Award for Best Urban/Alternative Performance was an honor presented at the Grammy Awards, a ceremony that was established in 1958 and originally called the Gramophone Awards, to recording artists for quality urban/alternative performances. Awards in several categories are distributed annually  by the National Academy of Recording Arts and Sciences of the United States to "honor artistic achievement, technical proficiency  and overall excellence in the recording industry, without regard to album sales or chart position."

The award was first awarded to India.Arie at the 45th Grammy Awards (2003) for her song "Little Things". According to the category description guide for the 52nd Grammy Awards, the award was presented to artists that had made "newly recorded urban/alternative performances with vocals".  The award was intended to recognize artists "who have been influenced by a cross-section of urban music" and who create music that is out of the "mainstream trends".

Two-time recipients include India.Arie, Cee Lo Green (once as part of the duo Gnarls Barkley), and Jill Scott. Erykah Badu, Big Boi (a member of OutKast) and will.i.am (a member of The Black Eyed Peas) share the record for the most nominations, with three each. Sérgio Mendes is the only performer to be nominated twice in one year. The category was dominated by Americans, yet individuals from Jamaica and Côte d'Ivoire also won the award. The award was discontinued from 2012 in a major overhaul of the Grammys where the category was shifted to the Best R&B Performance category.

Recipients

 Each year is linked to the article about the Grammy Awards held that year.

See also
 List of Grammy Award categories
 List of Urban contemporary artists

References

General
 
 

Specific

External links
Official site of the Grammy Awards

 
Awards established in 2003
Urban Alternative Performance